Serravalle di Chienti is a comune (municipality) in the Province of Macerata in the Italian region Marche, located about  southwest of Ancona and about  southwest of Macerata. It is crossed by the Chienti river. The communal territory is largely mountainous with numerous woods and pastures.

Serravalle di Chienti borders the following municipalities: Camerino, Fiuminata, Foligno, Monte Cavallo, Muccia, Nocera Umbra, Pieve Torina, Sefro, Visso.

History
Settled since pre-historic times, in antique times the Serravalle plateau featured a lake known as Plestinam Paludem. The area was subsequently ruled by the Etruscans and the Romans.

In the Middle Ages it was a fortress of the Da Varano family of Camerino.

Main sights
Parish church, with 16th-century frescoes by Simone and Giovanni de Magistris.
Church of Santa Maria di Pistia or di Plestia, in proto-Romanesque style. It was built over an ancient pagan temple of the Umbrian goddess Cupra. Once the cathedral of the town of Plestia, it was destroyed, together with the latter, by Emperor Otto III. It was rebuilt around the year 1000, to which date the current crypt and apse. The nave and the portico are later.
Convent of Brogliano.
Botte dei Varano, an artificial channel built by Giulio Cesare da Varano in the 15th century to dry the Karst plateau of Colfiorito. Recent restorations have shown the presence of a pre-existing Roman travertine structure.

Comunes
 
 
Cesi

References

External links
 Official website 

Cities and towns in the Marche